Abdul Ahad Hajni (born 19 April 1948) is an Indian writer, translator and treasurer of Adbee Markaz Kamraz. He predominantly writes in Kashmiri language. He is primarily known for translating Indian language books such as Assamese, Kannada, Telugu and Dogri languages into Kashmiri.

The recipient of Sahitya Akademi Award in Kashmiri, he wrote a book titled Teuth Pazar (Bitter truth), consisting translation of six short stories from different Indian regional languages into Kashmiri.

Awards 
2019: Sahitya Akademi Award  for Akh Yaad Akh Qayamat (One memory one judgement day)
2016: Sahitya Akademi Award  for Raay-Traay (opinions)

References 

1948 births
Kashmiri writers
21st-century Indian translators
Recipients of the Sahitya Akademi Award in Kashmiri
Living people
Recipients of the Sahitya Akademi Prize for Translation